Thiri Mahamingala Thupabadewi (1825 – after 1890), commonly known as the Laungshe Mibaya or Queen of Laungshe, was a royal princess and senior queen consort of King Mindon during the Konbaung dynasty. She was the queen mother of the Konbaung dynasty's last king, Thibaw Min. Being a cousin of King Mindon, she was promoted to a Nanzwe Mibaya and received the appanage of Laungshe when he ascended the throne.

Among her other children included 3 daughters, the Mong Kung Princess, Pakhangyi Princess, Meiktila Princess.

She was of Shan extraction, it's seems her grandmother by her father name "Kham Ing" is a daughter of the Sawbwa of Thibaw (Hsipaw). As Queen Dowager she enjoyed some power and a White House was built for her residence. However the Madalay's chronicle reported she died on 1 June 1881 
which is fake news for political reasons, but by reality she died no evidence exists but after 1890 there are still photograph of her living in the palace of Sawbwa of Loikaw in Shan State in those era, which nowadays is in Kayah State

Family
Issue
 Mong Kung Princess (1853 – 1862)
 Pakhangyi Princess (1858 – 1911)
 Thibaw Min (1859 – 1916)
 Meiktila Princess (1860 – 1896)

Notes

References

See also 

 Konbaung dynasty
 Mindon Min

Konbaung dynasty
1825 births
1881 deaths
Burmese Buddhists
Burmese royal consorts
Burmese people of Shan descent